The National Anthem of the Republic of South Ossetia, also known as Beloved Ossetia!, was adopted on 5 May 1995. The lyrics were written by Totraz Kokaev, and the music was composed by Felix Alborov.

Lyrics

See also
State Anthem of the Republic of North Ossetia-Alania
Aiaaira
List of national anthems

Notes

References

External links
Anthem of South Ossetia – The Russian language website "Osinform" features a page on the anthem, with new recordings.
The Russian language website "Iriston" features a vocal version of the anthem listed as "gimn_ryuo.mp3"

National anthems of the Commonwealth of Unrecognized States
1995 songs
South Ossetia
South Ossetia
South Ossetia